A hofje (diminutive of 'hof', 'court') is a Dutch word for a courtyard with almshouses around it. Hofjes have existed since the Middle Ages.

A hofje provided housing for elderly people (mostly women). They were privately funded, and served as a form of social security. In the Netherlands there are still a number of hofjes in use.

Hofjes are usually built in a U-shape with a yard or garden in the middle, and a gate as entrance. The shape of hofjes was most likely inspired by the (older) Begijnenhofjes—groups of small houses inhabited exclusively by religious women.

A distinction is usually made between the Begijnenhofjes and 'regular' hofjes. The former were used only by (Catholic) women, who were supporting themselves. They were a kind of cloister. The latter were more charitable institutions. 
 
To be eligible to live in a hofje one had to meet four criteria:
 Sex: almost all hofjes were founded for women, as they could be relied on to keep a household running; although hofjes for men and married couples did exist
 Religion: many hofjes were founded for people of the same faith as the founder (some hofjes were founded by church communities)
 Age: from the 17th century a minimum age was often used. Fifty years was common, and this was an old age in those years
 Social-economic background: hofjes were targeted for poorer people

In the 18th century some hofjes were founded for commercial purposes; the inhabitants would pay rent.

The "Hofje van Mevrouw Van Aerden" in Leerdam is open to visitors as a museum.

Cities with many hofjes in the Netherlands include:

 Alkmaar
 Amsterdam
 Delft
 The Hague
 Groningen
 Haarlem (see Hofjes in Haarlem)
 Leiden
 Utrecht

External links
Introduction to the history of hofjes
Museum Hofje van Mevrouw Van Aerden
Video tour of Haarlem's Hofjes
A map to the Hofjes in Amsterdam

Dutch words and phrases